Sundagrapha is a genus of moths in the family Geometridae erected by Jeremy Daniel Holloway in 1982.

Species
Sundagrapha tenebrosa (Swinhoe, 1902) Singapore, Peninsular Malaysia, Borneo
Sundagrapha lepidata (Prout, 1916) Borneo

References

Geometridae